Roger Guilhem (1925-2009) was a French former professional rugby league footballer who represented France at the 1954 Rugby League World Cup, as a  or . He was nicknamed La pieuvre (The octopus).

Career

Guilhem, then playing for AS Carcassonne, was called up to represent France in the 1951 tour of Australia and New Zealand and the 1954 Rugby League World Cup played in France. He took part only in a match during the tournament and was in the bench during the final against Great Britain, the latter winning the tournament.

Honours
 World Cup :
 Runner-up - 1954 (France).

 European Nations Cup :
 2 times champion in 1949 and 1952 (France).

 French Championship :
 4 times champion in 1946,1950, 1952 and 1953 (Carcassonne).
 5 times finalist in 1947, 1948, 1949, 1955 and 1956 (Carcassonne).

 Lord Derby Cup :
 4 times champion in1946 and 1947, 1951 and 1952 (Carcassonne).
 1 time finalist in 1948 and 1949 (Carcassonne).

References

1925 births
2009 deaths
AS Carcassonne players
France national rugby league team players
French rugby league players
Rugby league five-eighths
Rugby league forwards
Sportspeople from Aude
People from Carcassonne